Dublin, Wicklow and Wexford Railway (DW&WR) 67 (Rathmore) was a 4-4-0 locomotive built in 1905 at Beyer, Peacock and Company.  It was accompanied by engine 68 (Rathcoole) from the same maker.  They became the DW&WR's flagship passenger locomotives.

Background
The locomotives were acquired in 1905 about the time DW&WR network expansion to Waterford was complete.  They joined the DW&WR's other four 4-4-0s which had been in service for 10 years.

History
The build quality of No. 67 was found to be wanting.  It required a new front tube plate after only four years and it transpired the DW&WR had required Beyer-Peacock to cut costs.  No. 68 was regarded as somewhat the better engine.  No. 68 was targeted hijacked and severely damaged in a head-on collision on  23 January 1923 at  during the Civil War.  Everyone had been disembarked from the affected trains first and there were no injuries.

On amalgamation to Great Southern Railways in 1925 the remaining engine was renumbered and made the only member of Class 454/D8.  A 1948 C.I.E. report described it as "A nondescript engine and the only engine of its class, consequently difficult to place: otherwise it is a fair medium powered  passenger engine".  It was withdrawn the following year.

References

Further reading
 

4-4-0 locomotives
5 ft 3 in gauge locomotives
Railway locomotives introduced in 1904
Steam locomotives of Ireland
Beyer, Peacock locomotives
Scrapped locomotives